Story of the White-Haired Demon Girl is a three-part 1959 Hong Kong film adapted from Liang Yusheng's novel Baifa Monü Zhuan. The film was directed by Lee Fa and starred Law Yim-hing and Cheung Ying.

Cast
Law Yim-hing as Lin Ngai-seung
Cheung Ying as Cheuk Yat-hong
Lin Chiao (aka Lam Kau) 
Szema Wah Lung
Wong Chor-san
 Lee Yuet-ching
Shih Kien
Siu Hon-sang
Lee Heung-kam
Law Lan
Lau Kar-leung
Tang Chia

External links

1959 films
Hong Kong martial arts films
1950s Cantonese-language films
Wuxia films
Works based on Baifa Monü Zhuan
Films based on Baifa Monü Zhuan